The 2021–22 season of the Ukrainian Football Championship is the 31st season of Ukraine's top women's football league. Consisting of two tiers it ran from 31 July 2021.

Due to the 2022 wide scale Russian invasion of Ukraine, the competition was interrupted halfway and later abandoned as hostilities continued. It was decided to turn current competition standings into final standings with no official winners.

WFC Zhytlobud-1 Kharkiv were the defending champions.

Format
The format of competitions for the season changed again for both tiers, but not significantly. First of all the Ukrainian Association of Football found a consensus among Ukrainian male football clubs to adopt a female (women) team in each professional club. Another important event took place when Kryvbas signed an agreement with the Mykolaiv club "Nika" swapping places with it and entering the top tier instead of starting from the second. It was decided to expand the second tier doubling the tier in size by adding the newly created teams of existing male football clubs with intention to provide the goal of 12 teams in the top tier.

For the top tier (Vyshcha Liha) the twelve teams play a single round robin and then split into two groups with the first six competing in a double round robin for championship and the other six for relegation. The bottom two teams were to be relegated and the 10th placed team is expected to contest in two game play-off with the second-tier team to remain in the top tier.

The second tier (Persha Liha) is split in two groups of 10 teams and begin on 15 August 2021. Both groups play in simple double round robin with the top teams from both groups contest the championship title, while their runners-up will play-off for the 3rd place which then contest promotion play-off.

Participation of the top-tier teams in the Ukrainian Women's Cup is mandatory, while the other teams must compete only if voluntarily agreed to play. The UAF has warned of sanctions for the teams that registered to play in the cup competition, but decided not to show up.

Vyshcha Liha teams

Team changes

 Kryvbas Kryvyi Rih and Nika Mykolaiv signed a partnership agreement, after which Kryvbas entered top tier, while Nika started at the second.

Stadiums
The top stadium is a home turf, while second if available used during this season.

Managers

First stage

League table

Results

Statistics

Top scorers

Persha Liha teams

Team changes

Name changes
 KhPKSP (Kharkiv Professional College of Sports Specialization) changed its name to Kharkivskyi Koledzh.
 OKIP (Piddubnyi Olympic College) changed its name to Dynamo-OKIP Kyiv.
 Rodyna Kostopil reorganized into Veres Rivne.

Persha Liha

Group A

Group B

Top scorer

Group A

Group B

References

External links
WFPL.ua
Women's Football.ua

2021-22
2021–22 in Ukrainian association football leagues
Sports events affected by the 2022 Russian invasion of Ukraine